Hamidu Baba Braimah (born 6 August 1953) is a Ghanaian politician and a member of the First and Second Parliaments of the Fourth Republic representing the Salaga Constituency in the Northern Region of Ghana.

Early life and education 
Baba was born on 6 August 1953 at Salaga in the Northern Region of Ghana. He attended the Kumasi Polytechnic College and obtained his Diploma GCE Ordinary Level in Accounting. He attended the Ghana College, Tamale (now Ghana Senior High School) and obtained his Diploma in Business Studies.

Politics 
Baba was first elected into Parliament on the ticket of the National Democratic Congress for the Salaga Constituency in the Northern Region of Ghana during the 1992 Ghanaian General Elections.

He was re-elected into the second parliament of the fourth republic. He polled 14,091 votes out of the 26,171 valid votes cast representing 37.60% over his opponents Maha Rapheal Suleman who polled 11,572 votes and Abdlia Issah who polled 508 votes. He was defeated in 2000 by Boniface Abibakar Saddiqui who polled 9,620 votes representing 40.10% against Baba who polled 7,799 votes representing 32.50%.

Career 
Aside being a Politician, Baba was an Accountant.

Personal life 
Baba was a Muslim. He is married with 5 children.

References 

Ghanaian MPs 1993–1997
Ghanaian MPs 1997–2001
Living people
Ghanaian accountants
Ghanaian Muslims
National Democratic Congress (Ghana) politicians
People from Northern Region (Ghana)
21st-century Ghanaian politicians
1953 births
2009 deaths
Ghana Senior High School (Tamale) alumni